The Uruguayan Championship 1920 was the 20th season of Uruguay's top-flight football league.

Overview
The tournament consisted of a two-wheel championship of all against all. It involved twelve teams, and the champion was Nacional.

Teams

League standings

References
Uruguay – List of final tables (RSSSF)

Uruguayan Primera División seasons
Uru
1